Soufiane Koné (born 8 June 1980) is a French footballer.

Koné was born in Toulouse, France, on 8 June 1980.

He played as a forward, participating in 32 matches and scoring 6 goals for AS Nancy in Ligue 1 between 1998 and 2000, and in two matches for AS Cannes in 2003–4.

References

1980 births
Living people
French footballers
Footballers from Toulouse
AS Nancy Lorraine players

Association football forwards
21st-century French people